Chaouki Chamoun (born January 19, 1942) is a Lebanese contemporary artist.

Biography
Chaouki Chamoun was born in Sarine, in the Bekaa Valley. As a school boy he worked as an art instructor to pay for the education of himself and his younger brothers, while at the same time attending art and design night schools, before finally joining the Fine Art Institute at the Lebanese University in Beirut in fall 1968, at the age of 26. He received his Diploma of Higher Studies in Painting in 1972, and received a five-year scholarship on to study art in the United States the same year. 

In 1975, Chaouki received his Master of Fine Arts from Syracuse University, N Y. He was a PhD fellow at New York University from 1975 to 1979. Chaouki since continued his academic career as an influential educator and architectural designer both in the United States and in Lebanon, and has donated a number of his works to raise funds and scholarships for educational and social institutions in Lebanon, including Brave Heart, Tawasul, Seri-Art, Lebanese American University.

In 2013, he published The Art and Life of Chaouki Chamoun, an artistic autobiography with more than 300 illustrations of his work, combined with anecdotes and observations about art and the creative process. The book was one of a series on Lebanese artists such as sculptor Hussein Madi and painter and printmaker Mohammad Rawas.

A major exhibition of his work was held in 2013 at the Beirut Exhibition Center.

Publications

References

External links
 Chaouki Chamoun's Webpage
 Art in Lebanon
 Contemporary Middle East Wall Street Journal
 Olyvia Fine Art
 Canvas Magazine
 Chaouki Chamoun on Artnet
 http://www.dailystar.com.lb/Culture/Art/2013/Mar-12/209680-chamoun-looks-west-then-east.ashx
 https://web.archive.org/web/20140713122821/http://www.executive-magazine.com/society/lebanon-art-industry-overview-2013-2014
http://www.scmp.com/lifestyle/arts-culture/article/1064869/muslim-artists-rise-no-body-challenge
https://www.wsj.com/articles/SB127378397101791153

TV interviews 
 Future TV 2013, https://www.youtube.com/watch?v=OFutddsPY7M
 Future TV 2013, https://www.youtube.com/watch?v=XjR3HnuQMWM
 Al Manar TV 2013, https://www.youtube.com/watch?v=D_Eh_KvT6Dc
 Future TV 2013, https://www.youtube.com/watch?v=VCD3-Z4bFZo
 Future TV 2013, https://www.youtube.com/watch?v=I2mGq3xMnzY
 TL 2013, https://www.youtube.com/watch?v=yHR7yvX-VWI
 LBC TV 2013, https://www.youtube.com/watch?v=0oDCOI4k-eA
 OTV 2013, https://www.youtube.com/watch?v=VFM7YJWziqo

Living people
1942 births
Syracuse University College of Visual and Performing Arts alumni
Steinhardt School of Culture, Education, and Human Development alumni
Lebanese University alumni
American people of Lebanese descent
Lebanese contemporary artists